In Nazi Germany, transgender people had a variety of experiences depending on whether they were considered "Aryan" or capable of useful work. Historian Laurie Marhoefer argues that transgender people were a discrete target of Nazi persecution, citing instances of charges for violating Paragraph 183, a law against cross-dressing.

Some male-to-female transvestites were targeted under Paragraph 175 as part of the persecution of homosexuals in Nazi Germany; Germany's transvestite community had a recognized subcategory (referred to by Magnus Hirschfeld as early as the 1920s as "total transvestites" or "extreme transvestites") that would later be recognized more widely in medical literature as transsexual.

In 2022, the Regional Court of Cologne ruled that denying that trans people were targeted by the Nazis qualifies as "a denial of Nazi crimes".

Background

Institut für Sexualwissenschaft

See also
Persecution of homosexuals in Nazi Germany
Lesbians in Nazi Germany

References

Further reading

 

LGBT in Nazi Germany
Transgender genocide
Transgender history in Germany